James Mitchell Scott (October 2, 1860 – July 25, 1943) was a Canadian politician. He served in the Legislative Assembly of New Brunswick as member of the Progressive Conservative party representing York County from 1925 to 1935.

References

1860 births
1943 deaths
Progressive Conservative Party of New Brunswick MLAs